Austin Krajicek and Tennys Sandgren were the current champions, but did not compete this year.

Ken and Neal Skupski won the title by defeating Malek Jaziri and Alexander Kudryavtsev 6–1, 6–4 in the final.

Seeds

Draw

Draw

References
 Main Draw

Turk Telecom Izmir Cup - Doubles
2014 Doubles